Wiggo Kay Hanssen (17 July 1923 – 13 December 2007) was a Norwegian speed skater who competed in the 1952 Winter Olympics.

He was born in Tromøy and died in Arendal.

In 1952 he finished ninth in the 5000 metres competition.

External links
 
 

1923 births
2007 deaths
Norwegian male speed skaters
Olympic speed skaters of Norway
Speed skaters at the 1952 Winter Olympics
People from Arendal
Sportspeople from Agder